Herbert Berman (August 19, 1933 – July 6, 2014) was a politician in New York City. He served as a City Councilman from Brooklyn and was the chairman of the 
Council Finance Committee for several years.  Because of term limits prohibiting Berman from seeking reelection in 2001 to the Council, he sought the Democratic nomination for New York City Comptroller. He lost the Democratic nomination to former Board of Education President William C. Thompson, Jr. and was the nominee of the Liberal Party in the general election, which was also won by Thompson.

Berman then briefly served as Governor George Pataki's liaison to the Jewish community and was then appointed by Gov. George Pataki as president of the Roosevelt Island Operating Corporation, which runs the affairs of Roosevelt Island. Berman served in this position from 2003 to 2007. He died on July 6, 2014, from a long illness at the age of 80.

References

1933 births
2014 deaths
Politicians from Brooklyn
New York (state) Democrats
Liberal Party of New York politicians
New York City Council members